Marie-Sissi Labrèche (born 1969 in Montreal, Quebec) is a Canadian writer, most noted as the cowriter of the 2008 film Borderline. The film's screenplay was based on two of Labrèche's published novels, Borderline and La Brèche. At the 29th Genie Awards in 2009, Labrèche and her cowriter Lyne Charlebois were cowinners of the Genie Award for Best Adapted Screenplay.

Her novel Borderline was subsequently selected for the 2009 edition of Le Combat des livres.

Works
Borderline (2008)
La Brèche (2002)
Montréal, la marge au cœur (2004)
La Lune dans un HLM (2006)
 Psy malgré moi (2009)
Amour et autres violences (2012)
La Vie sur Mars (2014)

References

External links

1969 births
21st-century Canadian short story writers
21st-century Canadian novelists
Canadian novelists in French
Canadian short story writers in French
Canadian women novelists
Canadian women screenwriters
Canadian women short story writers
Best Screenplay Genie and Canadian Screen Award winners
Writers from Montreal
Living people
21st-century Canadian women writers
21st-century Canadian screenwriters